The Party of Russian Unity and Accord (Partiya rossiiskogo edinstva i soglasiya, PRES) was a political party in Russia with centrist, moderate pro-reform positions.

History
The party was established in late 1993. In the 1993 parliamentary elections it received 6.7% of the proportional representation vote, and won 27 of the 450 seats in the State Duma.

In the 1995 elections the party's vote share fell to 0.4%, and it failed to win any proportional seats, although it did win a single district seat. It did not contest any further elections.

See also
Party of Russian Unity and Accord politicians

References

Defunct political parties in Russia
Political parties established in 1992
1992 establishments in Russia